Zivilprozessordnung (ZPO) is the German code of civil procedure. It was enacted in 1887. It strongly influenced the Code of Civil Procedure in Japan and Taiwan.

See also 
 Bürgerliches Gesetzbuch (BGB) - the German Civil Code.

External links
Full text of the ZPO (in German)
Englisch translation of the ZPO

Law of Germany
Codes of civil procedure